Oak Grove High School is a secondary school located in the Edenvale neighborhood of San Jose, California, United States,  which serves students in grades 9–12. Average enrollment is 1800 students, compared to the state average of 1413. The school is part of the East Side Union High School District and its  mascot is the eagle. As of 2010, the principal is Martha Brazil.

Demographics 
This is the breakdown of ethnicity and gender of a school's student body, based on data reported to the government.
 American Indian/Alaskan Native     0.3%
 Asian                               26%
 Black                                5%
 Hawaiian Native/Pacific Islander     1%

Notable people 

 Chidobe Awuzie, NFL player
 Andre Carter, NFL player
 Eric Frampton, NFL player
 Mark Grieb, AFL player
 James Hodgins, NFL player
 Mike Holmgren (teacher), NFL coach
 Ash Kalra, California State Assembly Member
 Johnny Khamis, member of the San Jose City Council
 Marty Mornhinweg, NFL coach
 Fredwreck, Record Producer
 Marcus Reese, NFL player
 Tim Ryan, NFL player and NFL color analyst
 Dave Stieb, MLB pitcher
 Michael Whelan, artist/illustrator
 Gibril Wilson, NFL player
 Christina Kim, LPGA Golfer

References

External links 

 
 East Side Union High School District website

East Side Union High School District
High schools in San Jose, California
Public high schools in California
1967 establishments in California